Kuchhe Dhaage is a 1973 Indian Hindi-language action film directed by Raj Khosla. The film stars Vinod Khanna, Moushumi Chatterjee and Kabir Bedi. The music was scored by Laxmikant Pyarelal with lyrics penned by Anand Bakshi.

Cast
Vinod Khanna as  Thakur Lakhan Singh 
Moushumi Chatterjee as  Sona 
Kabir Bedi as Roopa / Pandit Tulsiram 
Trilok Kapoor   
K.N. Singh as Sona's Father 
Nirupa Roy as Thakurain - Lakhan's Mother 
Murad as Judge 
Dev Kumar as Thakur Bahadur Singh 
Bhagwan Dada as Ram Bharose 
Tun Tun as Raswanti Bharose 
Jagdish Raj as Amrutlal 
Ratnamala as Sona's Mother 
Purnima   
Zeb Rehman   
Randhir

Plot
In the state of Madhya Pradesh, India, particularly in the Chambal Ravine there are an abundance of bandit gangs, chiefly consisting of Brahmans and Thakurs, both carrying on their age-old rivalry and hatred for each other from generation to generation. Our story revolves around Brahman Pandit Tulsiram who betrays Thakur Bahadur Singh to the police, and as a result, Bahadur is sentenced to be hanged. Widowed, pregnant and devastated, Bahadur's wife swears that she will raise her child to hunt down and kill Tulsiram at any cost. She gives birth to a son, names him Lakhan, and lets the bandits teach their way of life. As soon as Lakhan grows up, he kills Tulsiram. Hearing of his father's death, army-man, Roopa, resigns and openly swears to kill Lakhan. Unknown to both of them, a beautiful young woman named Sona enters their lives, making them wish that they were living an honest life instead, and both fall head over heels in love with her. Both are on the verge of changing their lives when they find out that the other also has fallen in love with Sona, and they return to their bitter oaths - kill or be killed.

Song List

External links
 

1973 films
1970s Hindi-language films
1970s crime action films
Films directed by Raj Khosla
Indian crime action films
Films scored by Laxmikant–Pyarelal